Short track speed skating at the 2017 Winter Universiade was held from 5 to 7 February at the Baluan Sholak Sports Palace in Almaty, Kazakhstan.

Medal table

Men's events

Women's events

References

External links
Results book

Short track speed skating
Winter Universiade
2017